Osteopygis is a genus of extinct turtle. Osteopygis, as traditionally seen, is a chimera: the postcrania (including the holotype) belong to a non-marine stem-cryptodire, whilst the crania belong to sea turtles. In 2005 the referred material was split between two taxa: the postcrania remained in Osteopygis, while the crania were reassigned to Euclastes wielandi.

References

Macrobaenidae
Nomina dubia
Fossil taxa described in 1868
Taxa named by Edward Drinker Cope
Extinct turtles